Julio Franklin Santana (born January 20, 1974) is a former professional baseball pitcher in Major League Baseball.

Santana appeared in the inaugural season of the Tampa Bay Devil Rays and, along with Esteban Yan, was one of the last players from the 1998 Devil Rays active in professional baseball before his last season in 2012 with the Rockland Boulders.

His uncle is former MLB All-Star outfielder Rico Carty.

References

External links

1974 births
Living people
Detroit Tigers players
Dominican Republic expatriate baseball players in Canada
Dominican Republic expatriate baseball players in Japan
Dominican Republic expatriate baseball players in the United States
Fresno Grizzlies players
Major League Baseball pitchers
Major League Baseball players from the Dominican Republic
Milwaukee Brewers players
Montreal Expos players
Nashville Sounds players
Nippon Professional Baseball pitchers
Pawtucket Red Sox players
Sportspeople from San Pedro de Macorís
Philadelphia Phillies players
Rockland Boulders players
Texas Rangers players
Tampa Bay Devil Rays players
Toledo Mud Hens players
Yomiuri Giants players